Sportski žurnal (Serbian Cyrillic: Спортски журнал) is a Serbian sports daily newspaper. About half of the pages are devoted to football, whereas the rest deals with athletics, auto racing, basketball, boxing, cycling, judo, karate, handball, tennis, shooting, skiing, swimming, volleyball, waterpolo, wrestling, and other olympic and non-olympic sports. This may slightly vary in the off-season or during big sporting events.

Žurnal's first issue appeared on 17 May 1990, and it has since been published under the umbrella of Politika AD's family of newspapers and magazines (PNM).

See also
List of Serbian newspapers

Resources
 Official web site

References

Newspapers published in Serbia
Sports mass media in Serbia
Sports newspapers
Publications established in 1990